The Cloresmini, sometimes called bamboo coreids, are a tribe of leaf-footed bugs, in the subfamily Coreinae erected by Carl Stål in 1873.  Genera are distributed from India, China, Indochina, Malesia through to New Guinea.

Genera and species 
The Coreoidea Species File lists:
 Cloresmus Stål, 1860
 Cloresmus antennatus Distant, 1908
 Cloresmus boops Blöte, 1936
 Cloresmus ferrinus (Walker, 1871)
 Cloresmus jacobsoni Blöte, 1936
 Cloresmus javanicus (Westwood, 1842)
 Cloresmus khasianus Distant, 1901
 Cloresmus modestus Distant, 1901
 Cloresmus nepalensis (Westwood, 1842)
 Cloresmus pulchellus Hsiao, 1963
 Cloresmus signoreti Stål, 1860
 Cloresmus similis (Dallas, 1852)
 Cloresmus yunnanensis Hsiao, 1963
 Notobitiella Hsiao, 1963 - monotypic N. elegans Hsiao, 1963
 Notobitus Stål, 1860
 Notobitus abdominalis Distant, 1901
 Notobitus affinis (Dallas, 1852)
 Notobitus bambusae Henry, 1931
 Notobitus celebensis Breddin, 1901
 Notobitus dorsalis (Westwood, 1842)
 Notobitus elongatus Hsiao, 1977
 Notobitus excellens Distant, 1879
 Notobitus femoralis Chen, 1986
 Notobitus humeralis Blöte, 1936
 Notobitus marginalis (Westwood, 1842)
 Notobitus meleagris (Fabricius, 1787)
 Notobitus montanus Hsiao, 1963
 Notobitus mundus Distant, 1908
 Notobitus pallicornis (Dallas, 1852)
 Notobitus papuensis Horváth, 1900
 Notobitus parvus Distant, 1908
 Notobitus serripes (Dallas, 1850)
 Notobitus sexguttatus (Westwood, 1842)
 Priocnemicoris Costa, 1863
 Priocnemicoris antennatus Brailovsky & Barrera, 2007
 Priocnemicoris bicoloripes Brailovsky & Barrera, 2007
 Priocnemicoris cyclops Brailovsky & Barrera, 2007
 Priocnemicoris diversipes (Fallou, 1891)
 Priocnemicoris doesburgi Brailovsky & Barrera, 2007
 Priocnemicoris flaviceps (Guérin-Méneville, 1831)
 Priocnemicoris kiungensis Brailovsky & Barrera, 2007
 Priocnemicoris morobe Brailovsky & Barrera, 2007
 Priocnemicoris nigrellus Brailovsky & Barrera, 2007
 Priocnemicoris papuensis Brailovsky & Barrera, 2007
 Wasbauerellus Brailovsky, 2007 - monotypic W. modicus (Brailovsky, 2006)

References

External links
 
 

Hemiptera tribes
Coreinae